Corruption in Slovakia is a serious and ongoing problem.

Extent 
Transparency International’s Global Corruption Barometer 2013 indicates that corruption remains a serious problem in Slovakia. High-profile corruption cases have plagued the country, including the “Gorilla” case that surfaced at the end of 2011. In this case, secret wiretap recordings between 2005 and 2006 were leaked to the internet, bringing to light millions of Euros in bribes paid by a private equity firm to Slovakian government officials in exchange for privatisation and procurement deals. 

According to Global Corruption Barometer 2013, political parties rank as the third most corrupt institution in Slovakia, after the judiciary and public servants, and 56% of surveyed households believe the level of corruption in the country has “increased a lot” in the past two years. In order to combat corruption in the country, Slovakia has initiated several corruption reforms in recent years, including the creation of a central contract registry and publishing online all government contracts.

On Transparency International's 2021 Corruption Perceptions Index, Slovakia scored 52 on a scale from 0 ("highly corrupt") to 100 ("highly clean"). When ranked by score, Slovakia ranked 56th among the 180 countries in the Index, where the country ranked first is perceived to have the most honest public sector.  For comparison, the best score was 88 (ranked 1), and the worst score was 11 (ranked 180).

In August 2019, the Council of Europe’s Group of States against Corruption (GRECO) urged Slovakia to make more progress on the effectiveness of its legal framework and policies to stop corruption among employees with top executive positions and the police force.

Areas

Business 
Corruption is ranked as the second most problematic factor for doing business in Slovakia, according to the World Economic Forum’s, after inefficient government bureaucracy. Surveyed business executives report that public funds are often diverted to companies, individuals or groups due to corruption, and the lack of ethical behaviour by companies in their interactions with public officials, politicians and other companies represents a serious business disadvantage for the country.

Companies consider the occurrence of irregular payments and bribes to be fairly common in connection with imports and exports, public utilities, annual tax payment, and awarding of public contracts and licences or obtaining favourable judicial decisions.

See also 
 Crime in Slovakia
 Police corruption in Slovakia

References

External links
Slovakia Corruption Profile from the Business Anti-Corruption Portal

Slovakia
Crime in Slovakia by type
Politics of Slovakia